Christian Lane (born May 9, 1975) is an American singer-songwriter and music producer. His first band, Loud Lucy, was part of the Chicago indie-rock scene of the early-to-mid-1990s.

Career
Loud Lucy's debut album, Breathe, was released by Geffen Records in 1995.

Loud Lucy appear on the Tom Petty tribute album You Got Lucky: A Tribute to Tom Petty  with a cover of "Stop Draggin' My Heart Around". Louise Post of Veruca Salt contributed vocals on that song.

Loud Lucy toured with Alanis Morissette in the mid-90s.

Tom Higginson of Plain White T's has cited Lane as an influence..

The band dissolved a few years after Breathe. Lane moved to Los Angeles, CA to pursue a solo career and became involved with TV and film music. His songs have appeared in the films Confessions Of A Teenage Drama Queen and Wishcraft, and the ABC television show Men In Trees, among many others. Lane's song "Blow You Away" was used in the Austrian Idol competition by singer and winner Verena. He briefly formed a new band called Watson and played Los Angeles stages, before releasing a solo album, Meet Me At The Corner, under the moniker C.E. Lane. Lane returned to Chicago in 2018 and continues to write and produce music, including music for the SingFit app, designed as a therapy aid for people with PTSD and memory loss. He also creates the music for the Behind The Song podcast hosted by his wife, Janda Lane.

External links
 Christian Lane's Soundcloud
 Loud Lucy on Spotify

American singer-songwriters
Living people
Place of birth missing (living people)
1975 births
21st-century American singers